Cossmannica behainei is a species of sea snail, a marine gastropod mollusk in the family Pyramidellidae, the pyrams and their allies. The species is one of a number within the genus Cossmannica.

Distribution
This marine species occurs off the coasts of Vietnam.

References

External links
 To World Register of Marine Species

Pyramidellidae
Gastropods described in 1959